The 1950–51 NCAA men's basketball rankings was made up of two human polls, the AP Poll and the Coaches Poll. This was the first season with both polls, as the Coaches Poll (UP) was introduced.

Legend

AP Poll

UP Poll

References 

1950-51 NCAA Division I men's basketball rankings
College men's basketball rankings in the United States